Epifanio Bengoechea Benítez (born 12 July 1954) is a Paraguayan retired footballer who played for Spanish club Elche, as a defender.

References

1954 births
Living people
Paraguayan footballers
Elche CF players
La Liga players
Segunda División players
Association football defenders
Paraguayan expatriate footballers
Paraguayan expatriate sportspeople in Spain
Expatriate footballers in Spain